Phi in the Sky is an EP released by Kidneythieves in 2001, between the albums Trickster and Zerøspace. It features remixes and album versions of songs from Zerøspace.

Track listing
 "Black Bullet" (album version)
 "Placebo" (Terminalhead remix)
 "Zerøspace" (album version)
 "Zerøspace" (Q-Burns Abstract Message remix)
 "Spank" (KMFDM remix)
 "Zerøspace" (DJ Merritt remix)

References

External links
 Phi in the Sky Official website post

Kidneythieves albums
2001 remix albums